Ingrid Dahl Hovland (born 1959) is a Norwegian civil servant, and director of the Norwegian Roads Directorate.

She was born in Årdal. In her early career she was, among others, construction site leader at the Nordby Tunnel.

In 2019 she moved on to become director of the Norwegian Roads Directorate.

References

1959 births
Living people
People from Årdal
Directors of government agencies of Norway